The HUB Tower is a high-rise office building located in downtown Des Moines, Iowa, United States. It is tied with the EMC Insurance Building for the title of the 6th-tallest building in the city. Designed by Herbert Lewis Kruse Blunck Architecture in the Postmodern style, the building was completed in 1986. The building consists of an 18-story office tower that sits on a seven-story base, which houses a retail mall. The façade is composed of glass, metal and brick. The crown features a gabled front hipped roof tower.

The building was damaged on March 29, 2014, when the nearby Younkers Building burned down while in the midst of renovation. The building subsequently underwent repairs and a new building is currently being built on the former site of the Younkers Building.

See also
 List of tallest buildings in Iowa

References

Office buildings completed in 1986
Skyscraper office buildings in Des Moines, Iowa
Shopping malls in Iowa
Modernist architecture in Iowa
1986 establishments in Iowa